VK Rivaal Rakvere (temporarily named Rakvere FruitXpress due to sponsorship reasons) is a professional volleyball team based in Rakvere, Estonia. They play in the Estonian Volleyball League and the Schenker League.

History
VK Rivaal Rakvere was founded in 1990. In the mid-nineties the club completed three-peat, winning three national championships in a row – 1995, 1996 and 1997.
In 2001 an Estonian building material supplier Aeroc became the head sponsor for the team. 8 year tenure as a name sponsor ended in 2009 when local businessman Oleg Gross agreed to support the financial part of the team. In the last seasons Rakvere GT has not enjoyed the success they went through in the 1990s. Mati Merirand, who has been the head coach for over 20 years already has won multiple Estonian Championships and Estonian Cups during franchise history.

1990–01 VK Rivaal Rakvere
2001–09 VK Aeroc Rakvere
2009–12 Rakvere Grossi Toidukaubad
2012–   Rakvere FruitXpress

Seasons

Honours
Estonian League
 Winners: 1995, 1996, 1997
 Runners-up: 1993
Estonian Cup
 Winners: 1996, 1997

Players

Current squad
Coach: Urmas Tali

References

External links
 Official site

Estonian volleyball clubs
Sport in Rakvere